The William Bates House is located on South Carolina Highway 14 in Greenville County near Greenville, South Carolina. The two-story vernacular structure was built ca1835  for William Bates, a pioneer in the textile industry, who founded Batesville Cotton Mill. It is believed that the house is the only remaining structure associated with William Bates.

The house, built on fieldstone and granite piers, has one-story shed-roofed porches supported by nine wooden columns along the entire front and rear facade. An exterior chimney is constructed of brick while the interior chimney is made of brick and stone. The house has clapboard siding and a tin gabled roof. The dining room and parlor both have their original, hand-carved mantels.
When first built, the house was located on a 300-acre property.

References

National Register of Historic Places in Greenville County, South Carolina
Houses completed in 1835
Houses on the National Register of Historic Places in South Carolina
Houses in Greenville County, South Carolina